L'erba cattiva (en:Nasty grass) is the first studio album by Italian rapper Emis Killa. It was also his first LP to be distributed by Carosello Records.

Track listing
 Sulla luna – 2:01 (Giambelli – Dagani) 
 Cashwoman – 2:45 (Giambelli, Zanotto – Dagani, Zangirolami) 
 Parole di ghiaccio – 3:43 (Giambelli, Zanotto – Dagani, Erba, Zangirolami) 
 Dietro front (feat. Fabri Fibra) – 3:06 (Giambelli, Tarducci – Dagani, Zangirolami) 
 Come un pitbull – 3:38 (Giambelli – Florio) 
 Ognuno per sé (feat. Guè Pequeno) – 3:09 (Giambelli, Fini – Dagani, Erba) 
 L'erba cattiva – 3:49 (Giambelli – Dagani, Erba, Zangirolami) 
 Cocktailz (feat. G.Soave & Duellz) – 3:26 (Giambelli, Pignari, Soave – Caruso, Dagani, Zangirolami) 
 Nice pic – 3:05 (Giambelli – Giambelli, Zanotto) 
 Nei guai (feat. Tormento) – 3:10 (Giambelli, Cellamaro – Dagani, Zangirolami) 
 Giusto o sbagliato – 3:09 (Giambelli – Dagani, Erba, Zangirolami) 
 Il mondo dei grandi (feat. Marracash) – 3:46 (Giambelli, Rizzo – Dagani, Erba, Zangirolami) 
 Tutto quello che ho (feat. Fabio de Martino) – 4:38 (Giambelli, De Martino – Dagani, Lo Iacono, Zangirolami) 
 Il peggiore – 3:37 (Giambelli – Dagani, Erba) 
 Di.enne.a – 4:15 (Giambelli, Zanotto)

References

2012 albums
Emis Killa albums
Carosello Records albums